is a city located in Chiba Prefecture, Japan. , the city had an estimated population of  64,690 in 26,510 households and a population density of 500 persons per km2.

Geography
Asahi is located in far northeastern Chiba Prefecture, approximately 50 kilometers from the prefectural capital at Chiba and 80 to 90 kilometers from central Tokyo. Located at the northern end of the Kujukuri Plain, the southern part faces Kujukuri Beach and the Pacific Ocean, and the Shimōsa Plateau extends to the northern part.

Surrounding municipalities
Chiba Prefecture
Chōshi
Sōsa
Katori
Tōnoshō

Climate
Asahi has a humid subtropical climate (Köppen Cfa) characterized by warm summers and cool winters with light to no snowfall.  The average annual temperature in Asahi is 15.0 °C. The average annual rainfall is 1559 mm with September as the wettest month. The temperatures are highest on average in August, at around 25.8 °C, and lowest in January, at around 5.2 °C.

Demographics
Per Japanese census data, the population of Asahi has remained relatively steady over the past 70 years.

History
The Chiba clan, or branches of it, ruled the Shimōsa region for about 400 years from the Kamakura period. During the Sengoku period, the Chiba clan gained the protection of such powerful clans as the Odawara Hōjō clan, allowing them to get a stronger foothold over the area. They lost control when the Hōjō clan was overthrown in 1590 by Toyotomi Hideyoshi. After that, General Kiso Yoshimasa settled in the region. He restored the Ajito Castle, which was the inspiration for the name "Asahi." When poet Nonoguchi Takamasa visited the area in 1852, he wrote a poem about the general, from which the name "Asahi," which can mean "rising sun," was taken:

"from Shinano / 
adoring the rising sun / 
he came to the eastern land / 
and there remains the evidence of his earthly life"

In the Edo period, various agricultural changes in the region occurred. The first was the reclamation of the "Sea of Camellias", a vast lake, which was drained into the Pacific Ocean to create the fertile Higata Hachiman-goku. The second was spurred on by the arrival of agrarian scholar Ohara Yugaku in 1835 and other kokugaku scholars who helped to revive agriculture in the area. During this same time, while Iioka Sukegoro was helping to develop the fishing industry, fishermen from the Kansai region moved to the area to take advantage of the bountiful fishing grounds available.

The town of Asahi was established with the creation of the modern municipalities system on April 1, 1889. It was raised to city status on July 1, 1954. On July 1, 2005, the city of Asahi, the town of Hikata (from Katori District), and the towns of Iioka and Unakami (both from Kaijo District) merged on equal terms to form the new Asahi city.

The city was damaged during the March 2011 Tōhoku earthquake and tsunami.  Around 15 people were killed, 2,265 buildings were damaged, with 427 buildings destroyed, 716 people were left homeless, and heavy damage was done to the town's port and fishing boat fleet.

Government
Asahi has a mayor-council form of government with a directly elected mayor and a unicameral city council of 20 members. Asahi contributes one member to the Chiba Prefectural Assembly. In terms of national politics, the city is part of Chiba 10th district of the lower house of the Diet of Japan.

Economy
The local economy is dominated by commercial fishing, agricultural and seasonal tourism to its beach resorts.

Agriculture
Asahi City's agricultural output is ranked first in Chiba Prefecture and ninth in Japan.  The city's location on the coast of the Bōsō Peninsula gives it easy access to abundant fishing grounds created by the intersection of the Japan Current and the Okhotsk Current. Iioka fishing port has the second highest volume of fish unloaded in Chiba Prefecture.

Flowers
 Cyclamens
 Garland Chrysanthemum
 Petunia
 Transvaal (Bellis perennis)
 Rapeseed

Fruits, Vegetables, and Grains
 Cherry tomatoes
 Cucumbers (including heart-shaped and star-shaped)
 Mushrooms
 Parsley
 Pickling Melons (Muskmelon)
 Rice
 Slender green peppers
 Strawberries
 Takami Melons
 Tomatoes
 Zucchini

Seafood and Meat
 Flounder
 Infant Anchovies
 Inshore Oysters
 Pork
 Sardines

Education
Asahi has 15 public elementary schools and five public middle schools operated by the city government, and two public high schools operated by the Chiba Prefectural Board of Education.

High schools
 Chiba Prefecture, Asahi City Agricultural High School
 Chiba Prefecture, Toso Technological High School

Junior high schools
 Daiichi Public Junior High School
 Daini Public Junior High School
 Hikata Public Junior High School
 Iioka Public Junior High School
 Unakami Public Junior High School

Elementary schools
 Chuou Public Elementary School
 Chuwa Public Elementary School
 Higata Public Elementary School
 Iioka Public Elementary School
 Kojou Public Elementary School
 Kotoda Public Elementary School
 Kyouwa Public Elementary School
 Manzai Public Elementary School
 Oumei Public Elementary School
 Sangawa Public Elementary School
 Takisato Public Elementary School
 Tomiura Public Elementary School
 Toyohata Public Elementary School
 Tsurumaki Public Elementary School
 Yasashi Public Elementary School

Transportation

Railways
 JR East –   Sōbu Main Line
 Higata - Asahi - Iioka - Kurahashi
The Shiosai Limited Express service stops at Asahi and Iioka stations.

Highways

City landmarks

Administered by Chiba Prefecture
 Chiba East Prefectural Library
 General Sports Center, Toso Stadium
 Iioka Gyobu Misaki Observatory and Lighthouse
 Toso Culture Center

Administered by Asahi City
 Asahi Chuo Hospital
 Asahi City Public Library
 Asahi Sports-no-Mori Park
 Asahi Park Golf Course
 Fukuro Park
 Iioka swimming area
 Manzai Nature Park
 Ohara Yugaku Memorial Hall and Historical Park
 Taki-no-Sato Nature Park
 Unakami Community Athletic Park
 Unakami Camp Park
 Yasashigaura swimming area (nicknamed "The Mecca of Surfing")

Temples and Shrines
 
 Kamakazu Ise Daijin-gū
 Kumano Shrine
 Rai Shrine
 Ryūfuku-ji
 Tamasaki Shrine

Other
 Kampo no Yado hotel and hot springs (run by Japan Post Holdings)

Events

Annual
 Iioka Shiosai Marathon – first Sunday of February
 Fukuro Park Cherry Blossom Festival - April 1 - May 5
 Asahi Iioka Port / Seafood Festival - end of May
 Iioka Fireworks Festival – last Saturday of July
 Iioka "YOU You" Festival – last Saturday and Sunday of July
 Summer Fest at Yasashigaura - beginning of August
 Citizens' Tanabata Festival – August 6 and 7
 Asahi Beach Sand Sculpture displays
 Hebizono-deshimizu Cosmos Festival - beginning of October
 Ikiiki Asahi Citizens' Festival - middle of October
 Hikata Furusato Festival - middle of November
 Unakami Industry Festival - end of November

Other
 2010 National Sports Festival of Japan Table Tennis tournament (Held at Sports-no-Mori Park from September 30 to October 4)
 Goshinkosai Festival at Kumano Shrine (held every 12 years)
 Goshinkosai Festival at Dairi Shrine (held every 33 years)
 Miroku-sanbaso procession of Kurahashi (held every 20 years)

Sister and Friendship Cities
 -  Chino, Nagano Prefecture (Sister City) 
  - Nakagusuku, Okinawa Prefecture (Friendship City)

Mascots
Asahi City uses characters from Tetsuya Chiba's manga works as official mascots, including Mukai Taiyo from "Ashita Tenki ni Naare" as the mascot of Asahi Park Golf Course. Framed art and messages from Tetsuya Chiba can be seen in many public buildings. Tetsuya Chiba lived in Asahi (then Iioka-machi) during his childhood.

Noted people from Asahi
Noriko Arai, Paralympic athlete
Hiromichi Ishige, professional baseball player
Shoya Tomizawa, professional motorcycle racer

References

External links

 Official website 

 
Cities in Chiba Prefecture
Populated coastal places in Japan